Danny Chew (6 November 1987) is a defender who last played in the S.League for Woodlands Wellington FC.

Chew only turned professional in 2012 and played in his debut season with the Rams. He is known for his overlapping runs on the right flank to provide cover for his teammates and to add bite to any attacking moves, having great stamina to last for the whole game, a decent defender.

On 20 April 2012, Chew played for the first team squad for the first time in a friendly against NFL Division 2 side, Katong Football Club and he made his competitive debut on 27 April 2012 in a S-League match against Brunei DPMM FC.

On 23 November 2012, it was announced by Woodlands Wellington that Chew would be retained but due to work, he was unable to join for the 2013 season.

Chew continued playing for NFL Division 1 side Tiong Bahru FC and local futsal team MIB.

Club career statistics

All numbers encased in brackets signify substitute appearances.

References

External links
 

Singaporean footballers
Living people
1987 births
Singaporean sportspeople of Chinese descent
Woodlands Wellington FC players
Singapore Premier League players
Association football defenders